Geylang Road  is a major trunk road linking Singapore's eastern suburban areas with the country's central business district. Deriving its name from the area of Geylang where the road cuts through, it is fronted on both sides by low-rise shophouses protected statutorily from urban redevelopment in keeping with its history and urban heritage.

The road itself begins at the east where it meets Changi Road at the junction with Geylang Serai and Joo Chiat Road and continues westward until Kallang Road over the Kallang River at Sir Arthur's Bridge. Previously it was the only main thoroughfare linking Changi and Kallang, the former being the location of the Changi Airport while the latter was home to Singapore's first purpose-built civil airport, the Kallang Airport. As traffic mushroomed, Geylang Road was converted into a one-way street, and a parallel road, Sims Avenue, was constructed to the north to cater for traffic in the opposite direction.

See also
 Transport in Singapore

References
Peter K G Dunlop (2000) Street Names of Singapore Who's Who Publishing 

Roads in Singapore
Geylang
Kallang

Red-light districts in Singapore